God king, or God-King, is a term for a deified ruler or a pagan deity that is venerated in the guise of a king. In particular, it is used to refer to:
the Egyptian Pharaohs
a sacred king in any other polytheistic faith

See also

Devaraja
Euhemerism
Imperial cult
God emperor (disambiguation)
List of people who have been considered deities

References